Robert Irwin 'Bob' Kreiss (born 30 April 1953) is a former American tennis player who won the Wimbledon  Boys' Singles tournament in 1971.

Tennis career
Kreiss won the 1971 Wimbledon Boys' Singles title by beating Stephen Warboys in the final. He attended UCLA, where he played tennis for UCLA Bruins and earned All-American honors on three occasions, in 1970, 1972 and 1973.

Kreiss competed internationally and participated at the French Open, the Wimbledon Championship and the US Open. His best result at a Grand Slam tournament was reaching the second round at the 1974 US Open. During the 1974 Grand Prix season, Kreiss managed to reach two quarterfinals, at the U.S. National Indoor Tennis Championships in  Salisbury, Maryland and at the Irish Open in Dublin. In 1975 he reached the quarterfinals at the Cincinnati Open.

Junior Grand Slam titles

Singles: 1

References

External links 
 
 

1953 births
Living people
 American male tennis players
Wimbledon junior champions
Grand Slam (tennis) champions in boys' singles
Tennis players from Los Angeles
UCLA Bruins men's tennis players